Anandapally is a place in Kerala The nearest railway station Chengannur, about 25 km from Adoor. The nearest airport Thiruvananthapuram International Airport, about 92 km from Adoor. It lies on a road from the northern part of Kerala to the Hindu pilgrimage centre - Sabarimala.

Religion
Anadapally is Majority Christian, though contains religious minorities. There are five Christian churches within 2 km distance and the Anandappally St. Kuriakose Orthodox Valiyapally is the oldest one, which is situated in the Anandappally junction itself.

Economy
like its neighbouring Panchayats, one of Anadapally's main industries is rubber farming. There is also a large inflow of foreign currency due to the sizeable number of Anadapally natives working in Gulf countries.

Maramady Festival
Anandappally Maramady is a cultural festival of Kerala, which revolves around agriculture.

Bull surfing is a harvest sport that takes place in Anandapally during the post-harvest season.

References 

Villages in Pathanamthitta district